Robert James Hoffman III (born September 21, 1985) is an American actor, dancer, and choreographer.

Early life
Robert James Hoffman III was born in Gainesville, Florida, the son of Charlotte and Robert Hoffman II, and moved with his family to Madison, Alabama when he was seven. He has one younger brother, Chris, and two younger sisters, Ashley and Lauren. He attended Bob Jones High School. He discovered his passion for dancing after seeing Michael Jackson's Thriller. He briefly attended the Alabama School of Fine Arts.

Career
In 2004, Hoffman starred in the film You Got Served as Max, a lead dancer in the antagonist's crew. He also starred in Nick Cannon's sketch comedy television series Wild 'n Out. In 2006, he co-starred alongside Amanda Bynes in the film She's the Man.

In 2007, Hoffman played the role of Bluto in the horror film Shrooms. He also played the role of Clyde "Windmill" Wynorski in the comedy film National Lampoon's Bag Boy. Hoffman has guest starred in many shows such as American Dreams, Quintuplets, Vanished, CSI: Miami, Campus Ladies, Drop Dead Diva, and Grey's Anatomy.

In 2008, he starred in the film Step Up 2: The Streets as Chase Collins, a talented dancer at the Maryland School of the Arts (M.S.A). In 2009, he guest starred in the ABC Family show Greek as Evan Chamber's older brother. On 1 June 2008, Step Up 2: The Streets earned Hoffman and co-star Briana Evigan an MTV Movie Award for Best Kiss. In 2008, he and Evigan starred in Enrique Iglesias's music video for his single "Push", where they reprised their Step Up roles.

Hoffman appeared in the 2009 film Aliens in the Attic as Ricky. In 2010, Hoffman played the role of Chad Bower in the comedy thriller film Burning Palms. Hoffman featured as Garth in the musical comedy film BoyBand. He played the role of Tyler "Dance Machine" Jones in the movie Take Me Home Tonight.

He was also featured in Garfunkel and Oates's music video for their song "Present Face". In late January 2012, Hoffman landed a recurring role in the fourth season of The CW's teen drama series 90210 as Caleb Walsh, a student at seminary school studying to become a priest.

In 2014, Hoffman starred as Kevin Shepherd in the indie drama Lap Dance alongside Briana Evigan, Ali Cobrin, and Carmen Electra. Hoffman guest starred as Thad Callahan in the TV show The Night Shift. In 2016, he had a role in the comedy film Amateur Night directed by Lisa Addario and Joe Syracus.

Filmography

Awards

References

External links
 
 
 The Huntsville Times interview (March 15, 2006)

21st-century American male actors
Male actors from Gainesville, Florida
American male dancers
American male film actors
American male television actors
Living people
Male actors from Alabama
Male actors from Florida
People from Madison, Alabama
1980 births